Daniel Ramos may refer to:

 Daniel Ramos (graffiti artist) (born 1972), American graffiti artist
 Daniel Ramos (footballer) (born 1970), Portuguese footballer and manager